The 1912 Isle of Man TT races were again held   over the Isle of Man TT Mountain Course. Several manufacturers complained that the new mountain course was too arduous and threatened to boycott the 1912 races.

With an Indian clean sweep the previous year the British manufacturers' pride was dented but even with a smaller entry the Junior race held on Friday, 28 June, in the rain that challenged the belt-driven machines giving the advantage to the chain-driven ones. Two privately entered Douglas motor-cycles  of Harry Bashall and Ed Kickham took the first two places in the Junior TT race of 1912.

The Senior TT was held on Monday 1 July 1912. Frank A. Applebee on the two-stroke twin-cylinder Scott carried off the trophy after a hard race.  This was the first ever two-stroke Isle of Man TT win. Jack Haswell on single-cylinder Triumph was beaten by 6 minutes 54 seconds. Had not Frank Philipp's tyre come off the rim at Ballaugh on the last lap, Scotts would have finished first and second. Philipp's oval rim dropped him to eleventh place. Hoffman and Adamson placed two more Triumphs among the top six.

Junior TT final standings
Friday 28 June 1912 –  4 laps (150 miles) Isle of Man TT Mountain Course

Senior TT 500cc Race final standings
Monday 1 July 1912 –  5 laps (187.50 miles) Isle of Man TT Mountain Course

References

External links
1912 Isle of Man TT results

Isle of Man
1912 in motorsport
1912